Florian Kath (born 21 October 1994) is a German professional footballer who plays as a winger for 1. FC Magdeburg.

References

External links
 

Living people
1994 births
German footballers
Association football wingers
Bundesliga players
2. Bundesliga players
3. Liga players
TSG Balingen players
SC Freiburg players
1. FC Magdeburg players
People from Balingen
Sportspeople from Tübingen (region)
Footballers from Baden-Württemberg